Drukman is a surname. Notable people with the surname include:
 Haim Drukman (1932–2022), Israeli Orthodox rabbi and politician
 Steven Drukman, American playwright and journalist